The A16 highway is a highway in Lithuania (Magistralinis kelias). It connects Vilnus, Prienai and Marijampolė. The length of the road is 137.51 km.

The road is part of European route E28.

Section between junction with Savanorių prospektas (part of A1 highway) in Vilnius and Trakai is planned to be refurbished to dual carriageway. Section between A4 junction and Trakai is planned to be controlled-access.

Short section between Birštonas and Prienai is converted to dual carriageway. Turbo roundabout was implemented near Birštonas.

References 

Roads in Lithuania